Nivnice is a municipality and village in Uherské Hradiště District in the Zlín Region of the Czech Republic. It has about 3,300 inhabitants.

Geography
It lies in the Vizovice Highlands. The Nivnička brook flows through the municipality.

History
The first written mention of Nivnice is from 1261.

Economy
Nivnice is the seat of a major beverage producer and the largest fruit processor in the country, the company Linea Nivnice.

Notable people
John Amos Comenius (1592–1670), philosopher and pedagogue; most probable birthplace
Pavel Soukeník (1962–1988), sport shooter

References

External links

Villages in Uherské Hradiště District
Moravian Slovakia